is a residential district of the Shibuya ward in Tokyo surrounded by the residential areas of Hiroo, Ebisu, Daikanyama and Aoyama. Prince Hitachi and Princess Hitachi have their official residence in a palace in large gardens off Komazawadori in Higashi.

The main campus of the Kokugakuin University is in Higashi. All literature, economics, law and Shinto studies students populate the Shibuya campus. At the end of January, 2006, it was decided that the name of the main building, which was recently developed, would be Wakagi Tower (若木タワー, Wakagi Tawā).

Shibuya Station and Ebisu Station serve as the nearest rail stations. There are bus services from Shibuya and Ebisu, serving the educational campuses in Higashi and the Japanese Red Cross Medical Center in Hiroo.

Education
 operates public elementary and junior high schools.

All of Higashi 1-chome and parts of 2 and 3-chome are zoned to Tokiwamatsu Elementary School (常磐松小学校). Parts of Higashi 2, 3, and 4-chome are zoned to Hiroo Elementary School (広尾小学校). Parts of Higashi 2 and 3-chome are zoned to Nagayato Elementary School (長谷戸小学校).

Parts of Higashi 2, 3, and 4-chome are zoned to Hiroo Junior High School (広尾中学校). All of Higashi 1-chome and parts of 2, 3, and 4-chome are zoned to Hachiyama Junior High School (鉢山中学校).

References 

Neighborhoods of Tokyo
Shibuya